Paul Augustine Leyden (born 16 December 1972) is an Australian actor, producer, screenwriter and director. He is best known for playing the role of Simon Frasier on the daytime soap opera As the World Turns. He played Simon in the 2009 mini-series "Maneater".  He also had a brief stint on The Young and the Restless as "Blake".

Leyden was born and raised in Melbourne by his parents, John and Ros Leyden. He is one of five children. The actor starred in the mini-series Tribe, and can be seen in episodes of Farscape, BeastMaster, Law & Order: Special Victims Unit and Home and Away.

Personal life
Leyden's hobbies include playing outdoor sports, the saxophone, and guitar. He is married to Alexia Barlier, having done so in 2018. They have a daughter and live in Los Angeles.

Filmography
 The Hunter's Prayer (2017, producer, screenwriter)
 Chick Fight (2020, director)
 R.I.P.D. 2: Rise of the Damned (2022, director)

References

External links

1972 births
Australian male television actors
Living people
Australian film producers
Australian screenwriters